Hugh Stewart Jasper Welchman (born February 1975) is a British filmmaker, screenwriter, and producer.

Life and career
Welchman comes from Bracknell in Berkshire and attended the Dolphin School in nearby Hurst until moving on to Keble College, Oxford during the 1990s and graduated with a degree from Oxford University in Politics, Philosophy and Economics (PPE).

In 2002, Welchman founded the film company BreakThru Films. This led to him becoming the joint winner of the Academy Award for Best Animated Short Film in 2007. This was for the 2006 film Peter and the Wolf. The other winner was the film's director Suzie Templeton.

Welchman co-directed the first fully painted animated feature film Loving Vincent (2017) with Dorota Kobiela.

References

External links
 

1975 births
Living people
People from Bracknell
Alumni of Keble College, Oxford
Producers who won the Best Animated Short Academy Award
English animators
British animators
British animated film directors
British animated film producers
English film directors
British film directors
British screenwriters
English film producers
British film producers